Maison Blanc was a British bakery chain, founded by Raymond Blanc in 1981.

Closure
In 2017, the chain was closed by its owners Kout Food Group, as they left the UK market.

References

1981 establishments in England
2017 disestablishments in England
Bakeries of the United Kingdom